1830 in archaeology

Explorations

Excavations

Publications
 First volume of Lord Kingsborough's 9 volume Antiquities of Mexico

Finds
 Discovery of Pagans Hill Roman temple in south-west England
 Possible date – Discovery of Hunterston Brooch in Scotland

Awards

Institutions
 February 2 – Yorkshire Museum opened by Yorkshire Philosophical Society in York, England
 Geographical Society of London, predecessor of the Royal Geographical Society, is formed

Births
 May 14 – Antonio Annetto Caruana, Maltese archaeologist (d. 1905)

Deaths

See also
 List of years in archaeology
 1829 in archaeology
 1831 in archaeology

References

Archaeology by year
Archaeology
Archaeology